This is a list of cities and towns in the Northern Cape Province of South Africa.

Diamond Fields
 Barkly West
 Campbell
 Delportshoop
 Douglas
 Griquatown
 Hartswater
 Jan Kempdorp
 Kimberley
 Modder River
 Ulco
 Warrenton
 Windsorton

Green Kalahari
 Andriesvale
 Askham
 Augrabies
 Danielskuil
 Groblershoop
 Kakamas
 Kanoneiland
 Keimoes
 Kenhardt
 Lime Acres
 Louisvale
 Mier
 Olifantshoek
 Onseepkans
 Postmasburg
 Putsonderwater
 Riemvasmaak
 Rietfontein
 Upington
 Kathu
 Kuruman

Namaqualand
 Aggeneys
 Alexander Bay
 Carolusberg
 Concordia
 Garies
 Hondeklip
 Kamieskroon
 Kleinzee
 Nababeep
 Okiep
 Pella
 Pofadder
 Port Nolloth
 Soebatsfontein
 Springbok
 Steinkopf

Upper Karoo
 Britstown
 Colesberg
 Copperton
 De Aar
 Hanover
 Hopetown
 Hutchinson
 Loxton
 Marydale
 Norvalspont
 Noupoort
 Orania
 Petrusville
 Philipstown
 Prieska
 Richmond
 Strydenburg
 Vanderkloof
 Victoria West
 Vosburg

Northern Cape
 
Cities and towns